Methyl orange is a pH indicator frequently used in titration because of its clear and distinct color variance at different pH values. Methyl orange shows red color in acidic medium and yellow color in basic medium. Because it changes color at the pKa of a mid strength acid, it is usually used in titration of strong acids in weak bases that reach the equivalence point at a pH of 3.1-4.4. Unlike a universal indicator, methyl orange does not have a full spectrum of color change, but it has a sharp end point. In a solution becoming less acidic, methyl orange changes from red to orange and, finally, to yellow—with the reverse process occurring in a solution of increasing acidity.

Indicator colors 

In a solution that decreases in acidity, methyl orange moves from the color red to orange and finally to yellow with the opposite occurring for a solution increasing in acidity. This color change from yellow to red occurs because the protons in the acidic solution react with the N=N bond of the molecule, protonating one of them and changing the visible light absorption of the molecule to reflect more red light than orange/yellow.  
 
In an acid, it is reddish and in alkali, it is yellow.

Other indicators 

Modified (or screened) methyl orange, an indicator consisting of a solution of methyl orange and xylene cyanol, changes from grey-violet to green as the solution becomes more basic.

Safety
Methyl orange has mutagenic properties. When methyl orange is put under oxidative stress, one of the double-bonded nitrogen atoms that connects the aromatic rings gets radicalized and can further break down into reactive oxygen species or anilines, which are carcinogenic and can mutate DNA. Various bacteria and enzymes can also cause this breakdown to occur.

Synthesis
Methyl Orange is an azobenzene derivative that can be formed from dimethylaniline and sulfanilic acid through first, a diazonium salt formation with the sulfanilic acid, followed by a nucleophilic attack from the dimethylaniline and rearomatization.

UV/Vis Spectrum
The absorption of methyl orange on the UV/vis spectrum is between 350-550 nm, with its peak at 464 nm. This is in the green-purple visible light range and explains why methyl orange is, in fact, orange.

See also
pH indicator
Methyl red
Litmus
Phenolphthalein
Bromothymol blue
Congo Red
Universal indicator

References

External links

Informative page on different titration indicators, including methyl orange

Azo dyes
PH indicators
Benzenesulfonates
Anilines
Organic sodium salts
Dimethylamino compounds
Acid dyes